Samara Ermekovna Karimova (born 10 April 1991) is a Kyrgyz singer who is considered a pop star in her homeland. She is a soloist of the National Theater in Osh. She is married and has three children.

References

External links 
Samara Karimova at SoundCloud

1991 births
Living people
Ethnic Kyrgyz people (individuals)
Kyrgyzstani women singers
People from Batken Region